Leon Vandaele (24 February 1933 in Ruddervoorde – 30 April 2000 in Oostkamp) was a Belgian professional road bicycle racer. His biggest victory was the 1958 Paris–Roubaix.

Palmarès 

1954
Kuurne–Brussels–Kuurne
1956
Kampioenschap van Vlaanderen
Omloop van het Houtland
1957
Threedays of Antwerp
Paris–Brussels
Kampioenschap van Vlaanderen
Halle–Ingooigem
1958
Paris–Roubaix
Kampioenschap van Vlaanderen
1959
Gent–Wevelgem
1961
Kuurne–Brussels–Kuurne
Nokere Koerse

References

External links 

1933 births
2000 deaths
Belgian male cyclists
People from Oostkamp
Cyclists from West Flanders